Arthur Fery (born 12 July 2002) is a British tennis player.

Fery has a career high ATP singles ranking of 672 achieved on 9 May 2022. He also has a career high ATP doubles ranking of 517 achieved on 13 June 2022.

Education
Fery attended King's College School before enrolling at Stanford University, playing in the Pac-12 Conference.

Career
Fery competed in ITF junior events, reaching a career high junior world ranking of 12 on 2 March 2020. He reached the semi-finals of the 2019 Wimbledon Championships – Boys' doubles and the 2020 Australian Open – Boys' doubles. He received a wildcard into 2021 Wimbledon Championships – Men's singles qualifying, where he beat Prajnesh Gunneswaran and Matthew Ebden before losing in five sets in the final round of qualifying to Tallon Griekspoor, despite winning the first two sets and going a break up in the third. He was entered into the 2021 Wimbledon Championships – Mixed doubles as an alternate, partnering Tara Moore, after the withdrawal of Aslan Karatsev and Elena Vesnina. Fery and Moore were eliminated in the third round.

Personal life
Fery is the son of Olivia Féry, who was also a professional tennis player, featuring in the main draw of the women's doubles at the 1991 French Open and representing the Hong Kong Fed Cup team when she became a resident of Hong Kong.
His father is Loïc Féry, a French businessman and the president of football club FC Lorient.

Career finals

Singles: 3 (2–1)

Doubles: 5 (3–2)

References

External links
 
 

2002 births
Living people
British male tennis players
People from Wimbledon, London
Tennis people from Greater London
People educated at King's College School, London
Stanford Cardinal men's tennis players
British people of French descent
21st-century British people